The 1999 Mobiline Phone Pals season was the 10th season of the franchise in the Philippine Basketball Association (PBA).

Draft picks

Summary
Rookie Fil-Tongan 6-10 Paul Asi Taulava debut with a near triple-double of 32 points, 20 rebounds and 8 assists as Mobiline rout comebacking Tanduay Gold Rhum Masters, 90-64, in the opening of the league's 25th season on February 7. The Phone Pals had their best start in franchise history by winning their first seven games.  Mobiline finish on top of the standings in the All-Filipino Cup with an 11-5 won-loss slate and seeded number one with a twice-to-beat advantage against Barangay Ginebra Kings in the quarterfinal round. The Phone Pals were upset and lost two straight in which the last one was a heartbreaking 81-82 defeat on Bal David' winning shot at the buzzer.

Last season's Governors Cup best import Silas Mills return to the Phone Pals in the Commissioner's Cup. Mobiline lost their first two games before picking up their win against Shell, 78-74 in Sta.Cruz, Laguna on July 7.  The Phone Pals were three wins and five losses and seeded 8th and last in the quarterfinal round, they lost to top-seeded Alaska Milkmen.

Reinforced by former San Miguel import Larry Robinson in the Governors Cup, the Phone Pals had a similar three wins in eight elimination round assignments, they forced a sudden-death playoff with 2nd seeded Tanduay Rhum Masters before losing, 75-84 on November 17.

Occurrences
In Mobiline's first game on July 11 following the Andy Seigle-Jerry Codinera trade, rookie Asi Taulava played listless in scoring only six points and was fined for his below-par showing in a 74-103 loss to Sta.Lucia.

Roster

Team Manager: Nick de la Paz

Transactions

Direct hire

Trades

Recruited imports

References

TNT Tropang Giga seasons
Mobiline